Ivan Khovansky may refer to:

Ivan Andreyevich Khovansky (?–1621), Russian boyar and voyevoda
Ivan Andreyevich Khovansky (Tararui) (?–1682), Russian boyar
Ivan Ivanovich Khovansky (?– 1701), Russian boyar
Ivan Nikitich Khovansky (?–1675), Russian boyar and voyevoda